is the name of the traditional performance whether it is a song, music, as well as  dance that originated from Palembang, South Sumatra, Indonesia. Both of the song and the dance was created to describes the splendor, cultural refinement, glory and the grandeur of Srivijaya empire that once succeed on unifying the western parts of Indonesian archipelago and Malay world generally.

Etymology
While the word of  refer to the empire of Srivijaya that once ruled the Maritime Southeast Asia, which the capital took place in present-day Palembang, South Sumatra, Indonesia. Thus the  can be roughly translated as "the performance of Srivijaya", which in fact this  performance (music, song, and dance) mainly tell or invoked the splendor of Srivijaya empire.

Gending Sriwijaya song lyrics 
The first stanza is the original lyrics of the song, while the second stanza was added later.

Gending Sriwijaya dance 

The Gending Sriwijaya dance is an Indonesian traditional dance from Palembang performed to honor and welcome the visiting special guests. The dance is often performed during state ceremonies, luncheons, dinner party or receptions, in front of the state's VIP guests, such as the head of state, president, king, queen and royal guests, minister and ambassador. For example, the Gending Sriwijaya dance was performed during annual Festival Sriwijaya in Palembang.

The dance is based on the simpler Tanggai dance, and believed as the reenactment and recreation of the original welcoming ceremony commonly found in traditional Malay courts in the region, which demonstrate the Sekapur Sirih (bersirih or menginang) ceremony that offering the honored guests the betel leaf, areca nut and slaked lime. The dance is believed to be originated from the court of Srivijaya, and presented to describe the host's welcoming hospitality, friendliness, happiness, and sincerity, as well as to demonstrate the beauty, gracefulness and cultured refinement of Srivijayan court.

The dance is performed by nine young and beautiful women, wearing glittering songket-clad traditional costumes called Aesan Gede, completed with Selendang Mantri, Paksangkong and Dodot, and also wearing Tanggai gilded jewelry. It is believed that the  dance costume combine various cultural influences, notably Malay, Javanese and Chinese elements. These women represent the princesses of Srivijaya, and are guarded by two Pengawal male dancers holding yellow parasols and gilded spears. In the background, a singer would sing the Gending Sriwijaya song during the dance performance, accompanied with gamelan and gongs musical ensemble. Today however, the live singer is often replaced by playing taped recorded music. The simpler version is usually performed without male guardians.

Among the nine female dancers, there is one main dancer that wears the most complete and elaborated jewelries and costume, and acts as the prime lady. In the dance choreography, the prime lady would be the center and the foremost dancer. She holds tepak container as the props of Sekapur Sirih ceremony, and presents betel leaf, areca nut, and slaked lime for the honored guest to enjoy. On her sides, two other female dancers bring pridon, the brass containers traditionally used as spit container after the guests chew the betel nut. Today, however, the honored guest is not required to actually chew and spit out the betel nut, just the simple gesture of receiving or touching the tepak or pekinangan props would be enough. The Sekapur Sirih ceremony originally was only performed by king's daughter, the princess of Srivijaya, accompanied by other princesses, noble young women, and dayang (ladies in waiting).

See also

 Kebagh dance
 Melinting dance
 Baksa kembang
 Dance in Indonesia

References

External links 
 Gending Sriwijaya dance performance
 Gending Sriwijaya from Indonesia Kaya
 Gending Sriwijaya instrumental, orchestra version

Malay dances
Dances of Sumatra
Indonesian folk songs